The Pleiades, were the seven sister-nymphs, companions of Artemis, the goddess of the hunt. Together with their seven sisters, the Hyades, they were called the Atlantides, Dodonides, or Nysiades, nursemaids and teachers of the infant Dionysus. The Pleiades were thought to have been translated to the night sky as a cluster of stars, the Pleiades, and were associated with rain.

Etymology 
The name Pleiades ostensibly derived from the name of their mother, Pleione, effectively meaning "daughters of Pleione". However, the name of the star-cluster likely came first, and Pleione was invented to explain it. According to another suggestion Pleiades derived from πλεῖν (plein , "to sail") because of the cluster's importance in delimiting the sailing season in the Mediterranean Sea: "the season of navigation began with their heliacal rising".

Family 
The Pleiades' parents were the Titan Atlas and the Oceanid Pleione born on Mount Cyllene. In some accounts, their mother was called Aethra, another Oceanid. Aside from the above sisters, the Hyades, the Pleiades' other siblings were Hyas and the nymph Calypso who was famous in the tale of Odysseus. Sometimes they were related as half-sisters to the Hesperides, nymphs of the morning star.

Names 
Several of the most prominent male Olympian gods (including Zeus, Poseidon, and Ares) engaged in affairs with the seven heavenly sisters. These relationships resulted in the birth of their children.
 Maia, eldest of the seven Pleiades, was mother of Hermes by Zeus.
 Electra, mother of Dardanus and Iasion, by Zeus.
 Taygete, mother of Lacedaemon, also by Zeus.
 Alcyone, mother of Hyrieus, Hyperenor and Aethusa; Hyperes and Anthas; and Epopeus by Poseidon.
 Celaeno, mother of Lycus and Nycteus by Poseidon; and of Eurypylus and Euphemus also by Poseidon.
 Sterope, also Asterope, mother of King Oenomaus of Elis by Ares or wife of Oenomaus instead.
 Merope, youngest of the Pleiades. In other mythic contexts, she married Sisyphus and, becoming mortal, faded away. Merope bore Sisyphus several sons including Glaucus.

Mythology 

After Atlas was forced to carry the heavens on his shoulders, Orion began to pursue all of the Pleiades, and Zeus transformed them first into doves, and then into stars to comfort their father. The constellation of Orion is said to still pursue them across the night sky.

One of the most memorable myths involving the Pleiades is the story of how these sisters literally became stars, their catasterism. According to some versions of the tale, all seven sisters committed suicide because they were so saddened by either the fate of their father, Atlas, or the loss of their siblings, the Hyades. In turn Zeus, the ruler of the Greek gods, immortalized the sisters by placing them in the sky. There these seven stars formed the star cluster known thereafter as the Pleiades.

The Greek poet Hesiod mentions the Pleiades several times in his Works and Days. As the Pleiades are primarily winter stars, they feature prominently in the ancient agricultural calendar. Here is a bit of advice from Hesiod:

The Pleiades would "flee mighty Orion and plunge into the misty deep" as they set in the West, which they would begin to do just before dawn during October–November, a good time of the year to lay up your ship after the fine summer weather and "remember to work the land"; in Mediterranean agriculture autumn is the time to plough and sow.

The poetess Sappho mentions the Pleiades in one of her poems:The moon has goneThe Pleiades goneIn dead of nightTime passes onI lie aloneThe poet Lord Tennyson mentions the Pleiades in his poem Locksley Hall:Many a night I saw the Pleiads, rising through the mellow shade,Glitter like a swarm of fire-flies tangled in a silver braid.The loss of one of the sisters, Merope, in some myths may reflect an astronomical event wherein one of the stars in the Pleiades star cluster disappeared from view by the naked eye.

God mentions Pleiades and Orion in the book of Job:

“Can you bind the beautiful Pleiades?
Can you loose the cords of Orion?
Can you bring forth the constellations in their seasons or lead out the Bear with its cubs?” (Job 38:31-32, NIV)

Alternative version 

Although most accounts are uniform as to the number, names, and main myths concerning the Pleiades, the mythological information recorded by a scholiast on Theocritus' Idylls with reference to Callimachus has nothing in common with the traditional version. According to it, the Pleiades were daughters of an Amazonian queen; their names were Maia, Coccymo, Glaucia, Protis, Parthenia, Stonychia, and Lampado. They were credited with inventing ritual dances and nighttime festivals.

See also

 Alexandrian Pleiad
 Kṛttikā
 Peleiades
 Seven-dots glyph

Notes

References
 Apollodorus, Apollodorus, The Library, with an English Translation by Sir James George Frazer, F.B.A., F.R.S. in 2 Volumes. Cambridge, Massachusetts, Harvard University Press; London, William Heinemann Ltd. 1921. . Online version at the Perseus Digital Library.
 Apollonius Rhodius, Argonautica, edited and translated by William H. Race, Loeb Classical Library No. 1, Cambridge, Massachusetts, Harvard University Press, 2009. . Online version at Harvard University Press.
 Campbell, David A., Greek Lyric, Volume III: Stesichorus, Ibycus, Simonides, and Others,  Loeb Classical Library No. 476, Cambridge, Massachusetts, Harvard University Press, 1991. . Online version at Harvard University Press.
 Fowler, R. L. (2013), Early Greek Mythography: Volume 2: Commentary, Oxford University Press, 2013. .
 Gantz, Timothy, Early Greek Myth: A Guide to Literary and Artistic Sources, Johns Hopkins University Press, 1996, Two volumes:  (Vol. 1),  (Vol. 2).
 Grimal, Pierre, The Dictionary of Classical Mythology, Wiley-Blackwell, 1996. .
 Hard, Robin (2004), The Routledge Handbook of Greek Mythology: Based on H.J. Rose's "Handbook of Greek Mythology", Psychology Press, 2004, . Google Books.
 Hard, Robin (2015), (trans.) Eratosthenes and Hyginus: Constellation Myths, With Aratus's Phaenomena, Oxford University Press, 2015. .
 Hesiod, Works and Days, in Hesiod, Theogony, Works and Days, Testimonia, Edited and translated by Glenn W. Most. Loeb Classical Library No. 57. Cambridge, Massachusetts, Harvard University Press, 2018. . Online version at Harvard University Press.
 Homer, The Iliad with an English Translation by A.T. Murray, Ph.D. in two volumes. Cambridge, Massachusetts, Harvard University Press; London, William Heinemann, Ltd. 1924. Online version at the Perseus Digital Library.
 Homer, The Odyssey with an English Translation by A.T. Murray, Ph.D. in two volumes. Cambridge, Massachusetts, Harvard University Press; London, William Heinemann, Ltd. 1919. Online version at the Perseus Digital Library.
 Hyginus, Gaius Julius, Fabulae in Apollodorus' Library and Hyginus' Fabulae: Two Handbooks of Greek Mythology, Translated, with Introductions by R. Scott Smith and Stephen M. Trzaskoma, Hackett Publishing Company,  2007. .
 Ovid, Ovid's Fasti, Translated by James G. Frazer. Revised by G. P. Goold, Loeb Classical Library No. 253, Cambridge, Massachusetts, Harvard University Press, 1931 (first published), 1996 (reprinted with corrections). . Online version at Harvard University Press.
 Quintus Smyrnaeus, Posthomerica, edited and translated by Neil Hopkinson, Loeb Classical Library No. 19, Cambridge, Massachusetts, Harvard University Press, 2018. . Online version at Harvard University Press.
 Tripp, Edward, Crowell's Handbook of Classical Mythology, Thomas Y. Crowell Co; First edition (June 1970). .
 West, M. L. (1978), Hesiod: Works and Days, Clarendon Press Oxford, 1978. .
 West, M. L. (2003), Greek Epic Fragments: From the Seventh to the Fifth Centuries BC, edited and translated by Martin L. West, Loeb Classical Library No. 497, Cambridge, Massachusetts, Harvard University Press, 2003.  . Online version at Harvard University Press.
 
 
 

 
Nymphs
Children of Atlas
Arcadian characters in Greek mythology
Arcadian mythology
Pleiades Open Cluster
Fictional septets
Metamorphoses into inanimate objects in Greek mythology